Vrben is a village in the municipality of Mavrovo and Rostuša, North Macedonia. The village situated at an altitude of 1610 m and belongs to the Upper Reka region located near the city of Debar, North Macedonia.

Demographics
Vrben (Virbjeni) is recorded in the Ottoman defter of 1467 as a village in the ziamet of Reka which was under the authority of Karagöz Bey. The village had a total of nine households and the anthroponyms attested depict a mixed Albanian-Slavic character, with clear instances of Slavic influence or Slavicisation. This is encapsulated by the usage of patronyms with the Slavic suffix -ovići by individuals bearing Albanian first names (e.g., Ndrec Llazarovići). The patronymic Tanušovići also appears and is derived from the Albanian personal name Tanush with the addition of the aforementioned Slavic suffix.  
  
In statistics gathered by Vasil Kanchov in 1900, the village of Vrben was inhabited by 300 Orthodox Albanians and 360 Muslim Albanians. The Yugoslav census of 1953 recorded 171 people of whom 145 were Macedonians, 26 were Albanians and 3 others. The 1961 Yugoslav census recorded 331 people of whom were 283 Macedonians, 37 Albanians, 3 Turks and 8 others. The 1971 census recorded 231 people of whom were 203 Macedonians and 28 Albanians. The 1981 Yugoslav census recorded 234 people of whom were 195 Macedonians and 39 Albanians. The Macedonian census of 1994 recorded 180 people of whom 172 Macedonians and 8 Albanians. According to the 2002 census, the village had a total of 142 inhabitants. Ethnic groups in the village include:

Macedonians 135
Albanians 7

Notable people 
Famous people originating from Vrben include Paskal Sotirovski, world-recognized astrophysicist, and Selvije Saliu, politician. The orthodox church "Sv. Petka" is the most important community institution in the village.

References

Villages in Mavrovo and Rostuša Municipality
Albanian communities in North Macedonia